Joseph Maroon (born May 26, 1940) is an American neurosurgeon, author, and triathlon athlete. He is the professor and vice chairman of the Department of Neurological Surgery at the University of Pittsburgh Medical Center, and is the current medical director of WWE. He is particularly known for his work studying concussions and concussion prevention as well as his hypothesis (after the discovery of the CTE by Dr. Bennet Omalu) on the development of chronic traumatic encephalopathy (CTE).

Education 
Maroon earned his B.S. degree in anatomy and physiology from Indiana University in 1961, and  his M.D. from the Indiana University School of Medicine (IUSOM) in 1965. He received post-graduate education at IUSOM (1966), Georgetown University Hospital (1967), John Radcliffe Hospital (1969), IUSOM (1971) and the University of Vermont College of Medicine (1972).

Career

Neurosurgical research and innovations 
Maroon has conducted extensive research into neurotrauma, brain tumors and diseases of the spine, which led to many innovative techniques for diagnosing and treating these disorders. Maroon was the first to publish on the use of ultrasound to detect venous air emboli (1968). Maroon et al. were the first to publish on the use of ultrasound to detect air in patients during neurosurgical procedures (1969) and to assess ophthalmic artery reversal of flow indicating a thrombosis of the carotid artery (1969). Maroon et al. published the simplified instrumentation for performing microvascular surgery in 1973 and in 1975, they pioneered the microsurgical approach to intra-orbital tumors. In 1977, they pioneered the use of CT scanning as a guidance system for performing intracranial biopsy. In the same year, Maroon published the first paper on “burning hands” syndrome related to sports related spinal cord injuries in JAMA.

In 1982, Maroon et al. pioneered the radical orbital decompression procedure for severe dysthyroid exophthalmos. In 1985, they were the first to compare microsurgical disc removal with chemonucleolysis, and in 1986, they were the first to use a carbon dioxide laser in the management of lymphangiomas of the orbit. That year, Maroon et al. were among the first to describe their surgery outcomes with microlumbar discectomy. In 1987, Maroon and Onik introduced percutaneous automated discectomy as a new minimally invasive way to remove lumbar discs, and subsequently published extensively on this technique. In 1990, Maroon et al. published the first microsurgical approach to far lateral disc herniations in the lumbar spine and in 2007, they published the case of Golfer's Stroke from Vertebral Artery Dissection.

Further groundbreaking publications include the use of fish oil as an anti-inflammatory and alternative to nonsteroidal drugs for discogenic pain (2006); a unifying, immunoexcitotoxicity hypothesis for chronic traumatic encephalopathy (2011); and the possible use of a restricted calorie ketogenic diet for the treatment of glioblastoma multiforme (2013).

Sports medicine, concussion and chronic traumatic encephalopathy (CTE) 
Maroon is the team neurosurgeon for the Pittsburgh Steelers and the medical director of WWE. He is past-President of the Congress of Neurological Surgeons.

Together with neuropsychologist Mark Lovell, Maroon developed ImPACT (Immediate Post-Concussion Assessment and Cognitive Testing), a test to assess presence and severity of concussion symptoms. This has become the standard tool to assess sports-related concussions.

Maroon is interested in the prevention and treatment of concussions, specifically in football. In 2006, he joined the National Football League’s mild Traumatic Brain Injury Committee, which, in 2007, was renamed the Head, Neck and Spine Committee. He has been consulted as expert by American media on this subject.

Based on his research into the predictors and scope of chronic traumatic encephalopathy (CTE),  he claims there is reason to be skeptical of the reported widespread incidence of CTE. His position has mostly been met with negative comment across the media and sports press due to the NFL having as many as 4500 former players reporting symptoms of CTE.

Maroon was asked to testify to the New York City Council on a proposed rule on sideline medical coverage for organized youth football in the city. Together with Russell Blaylock, he developed an inflammation hypothesis for the biochemical mechanisms involved in the development of CTE following head trauma. In the 2015 movie Concussion, which "examines how American football players suffer from major head injuries and life-long debilitating problems as a result of repeated concussions, and efforts by the National Football League to deny it", Maroon was played by actor Arliss Howard. In the movie, Maroon is being portrayed as an NFL-biased doctor who tries to deny any relationship between football concussions and the brain pathology which Dr. Bennet Omalu found and attributed to CTE. Since the release of the movie, several people came forward in defense of Maroon, stating that his portrayal in the movie is sensationalized and incorrect.

Burnout prevention and balancing life
After his personal experience with burnout at the peak of his medical career, Maroon developed a strong interest in burnout prevention and living a more balanced life. He conducted extensive research into burnout, burnout prevention, and what constitutes a healthy, balanced and successful life, outside of a professional career. Maroon has given keynote presentations on this subject matter at national and international conferences. In 2017, he published the book Square One: A Simple Guide to a Balanced Life.

Publications 
Maroon has published over 270 peer-reviewed scientific articles, some of which may be found in the United States National Library of Medicine's publication database; his H-index, a measure of scientific research impact, is 43.

Books 
Square One: A Simple Guide to a Balanced Life Maroon J, Kennedy C. (2017) 

The Longevity Factor: How Resveratrol and Red Wine Activate Genes for a longer and Healthier Life Maroon JC. (2008)  (made into a PBS Special)

Fish Oil: The Natural Anti-Inflammatory Maroon JC, Bost J. (2006) 

Practice Diagnosis and Management of Orbital Disease Kennerdell JS, Cockerham KP, Maroon JC, Rothfus WE. (2001) 

What You Can Do About Cancer. Maroon JC. (1969) Doubleday& Co., New York, 185 pp. (English, Italian, German and French translations).

Athletic career 

Maroon has competed in 8 Ironman Triathlons (Hawaii – 1993, 2003, 2008, 2010, 2013; Canada – 1995; New Zealand – 1997; Germany – 2000) and is to this day an active triathlon athlete. Dr. Maroon was inducted into the Lou Holtz Upper Ohio Valley Hall of Fame in 1999, the Western Chapter of the Pennsylvania Sports Hall of Fame in 2009 and in 2010 also to the National Fitness Hall of Fame in Chicago. For 2016, in the global ranking of Ironman athletes, Maroon ranks in 4th place in his age group.

References

External links
Articles authored/co-authored by Marron in the United States National Library of Medicine database

1940 births
Living people
American neurosurgeons
American male triathletes
Indiana University School of Medicine alumni
Pittsburgh Steelers personnel
Physicians from West Virginia
University of Pittsburgh faculty
Writers from Wheeling, West Virginia